Francis Manning Marlborough Pryor  (born 13 January 1945) is an English archaeologist specialising in the study of the Bronze and Iron Ages in Britain. He is best known for his discovery and excavation of Flag Fen, a Bronze Age archaeological site near Peterborough, as well as for his frequent appearances on the Channel 4 television series Time Team.

Born to a Burke's Landed Gentry family, Pryor studied at Eton College before going on to study archaeology at Trinity College, Cambridge. With his first wife, Sylvia Page, he moved to Canada, where he worked as a technician at the Royal Ontario Museum for a year before returning to Britain.

He has now retired from full-time field archaeology, but still appears on television and writes books as well as being a working sheep farmer.

Biography 

Pryor is the son of Barbara Helen Robertson and Robert Matthew Marlborough Pryor MBE TD (known as Matthew), as well as being the grandson of Walter Marlborough Pryor DSO DL JP; both his grandfather and father had been British Army officers, serving in the First and Second World Wars respectively.  He was educated at Temple Grove School in East Sussex, then at Eton College alongside his first cousin William Pryor, before studying archaeology at Trinity College, Cambridge, gaining a PhD in 1985.

He married Sylvia in 1969, and migrated with her to Toronto, Ontario, Canada, on a landed immigrant scheme. There he started working at the Royal Ontario Museum as technician, working for Doug Tushingham who helped fund Pryor's first project in the United Kingdom. This was at North Elmham in Norfolk, and the excavation was directed by Peter Wade-Martins, who exposed Pryor to the benefit of opening large-area excavations.

Pryor returned to the UK in 1970, where the construction of the new town at Peterborough offered the opportunity to do large scale archaeology ahead of the planned development work. Between 1970 and 1978, he alternated between digs in the UK and writing up the excavation reports and giving presentations on his work in Canada. Pryor and his first wife were divorced in 1977, and during the course of these projects, he met his second wife, Maisie Taylor, an expert in prehistoric wood who later also appeared on Time Team; they worked together on the series of projects in the Peterborough area, the most famous of which is Flag Fen. He has a daughter, Amy, from his first marriage. He was a founding member of the Institute of Field Archaeologists in 1982.

In 1991, he published his first book about Flag Fen, entitled Flag Fen: Prehistoric Fenland Centre, for a series co-produced by English Heritage and B.T. Batsford. The final monograph on the site – entitled The Flag Fen Basin: Archaeology and environment of a Fenland Landscape – was published in 2001 as an English Heritage Archaeological Report. Pryor followed this with a third book on the site, published by Tempus in 2005; entitled Flag Fen: Life and Death of a Prehistoric Landscape, it represented what he considered to be a "major revision" of his 1991 work, for instance rejecting the earlier "lake village" concept.
Pryor was awarded an MBE "for services to tourism" in the 1999 Queen's Birthday Honours.

Since his retirement from archaeology, Pryor has devoted his time to sheep farming, being the owner of 40 acres of fenland pasture in Lincolnshire. In an interview with the Financial Times, he asserted that through this vocation, he felt a connection with the people of Bronze Age Britain, who also lived off this form of subsistence, before also expressing his opinion that human overpopulation represented a significant threat to the human species, urging people to have fewer children and eat less meat.

One of Pryor's four times great grandfathers is Samuel Hoare, the Quaker and founding member of the Society for Effecting the Abolition of the Slave Trade.

Bibliography

 
 ebook
 (Alan Cadbury crime novel 1)

 (Alan Cadbury, crime novel 2)

Britain BC - Two-part Channel 4 series, 2003;
Britain AD - Three-part Channel 4 series, 2004.

See also

 W. G. Hoskins, author of The Making of the English Landscape

References

1945 births
Alumni of Trinity College, Cambridge
English archaeologists
Members of the Order of the British Empire
Fellows of the Society of Antiquaries of London
Living people
People educated at Eton College
People educated at Temple Grove School
Archaeologists appearing on Time Team